Timeline of the COVID-19 pandemic in Malaysia may refer to:

Timeline of the COVID-19 pandemic in Malaysia (2020)
Timeline of the COVID-19 pandemic in Malaysia (2021)
Timeline of the COVID-19 pandemic in Malaysia (2022)
Timeline of the COVID-19 pandemic in Malaysia (2023)

 
Malaysia